Q School 2018 – Event 1 was the first of three qualifying tournaments for the 2018–19 snooker season. It took place from 14 to 19 May 2018 at the Meadowside Leisure Center in Burton-upon-Trent, England.

Format
The tournament consisted of players being randomly assigned to four sections. Each section plays in the knockout system with the winner of each section earning a two-year tour card to play on the main tour for the 2018–19 snooker season and 2019–20 snooker season. All matches were the best-of-7. All four players who qualified, Jak Jones, Sam Baird, Hammad Miah and Sam Craigie, had previously lost their professional status after the 2018 World Snooker Championship.

In one match, Barry Pinches played his son Luke.

Main draw
Results are shown below.

Section 1
Round 1

Section 2
Round 1

Section 3
Round 1

Section 4
Round 1

Century breaks
Total: 23

 133, 102  Sam Baird
 125  Phil O’Kane
 124  Michael Williams
 119, 101, 100  Sam Craigie
 118, 101  Hammad Miah
 118  Ben Hancorn
 118  Jordan Brown
 117  James Silverwood
 114  Haydon Pinhey
 114  Hu Hao
 110  Laxman Rawat
 108  Jamie O'Neill
 106  Jamie Cope
 103  David Lilley 
 103  Jak Jones
 101  Jamie Curtis-Barrett
 101  Jake Nicholson
 101  Brandon Sargeant
 100  Kristján Helgason

References

Snooker competitions in England
Q School (snooker)
2018 in snooker
2018 in English sport
Sport in Burton upon Trent
May 2018 sports events in the United Kingdom